Georges Serlez (27 March 1888 – 19 March 1978) was a Belgian equestrian. He competed in the individual dressage event at the 1924 Summer Olympics.

References

External links
 

1888 births
1978 deaths
Belgian male equestrians
Belgian dressage riders
Olympic equestrians of Belgium
Equestrians at the 1924 Summer Olympics
Sportspeople from Kortrijk
20th-century Belgian people